Hall Park Academy (formerly Eastwood Comprehensive School) is a coeducational secondary school and sixth form  located in Eastwood in the English county of Nottinghamshire.

Previously a community school administered by Nottinghamshire County Council, Eastwood Comprehensive School converted to academy status on 1 July 2014 and was renamed Hall Park Academy. The school is now sponsored by the Redhill Academy Trust, however Hall Park Academy continues to coordinate with Nottinghamshire County Council for admissions.

Hall Park Academy offers GCSEs, BTECs and NVQs as programmes of study for pupils, while students in the sixth form have the option to study from a range of A Levels and further BTECs.

History

Technical school
The school was known as Eastwood Hall Park Secondary Technical School, a technical-grammar school, which opened in 1957.

Notable former pupils

Eastwood Comprehensive School
 Samit Patel, cricketer 
 Lone (musician), electronic musician

Hall Park Technical Grammar School
 Stuart Boam, who was a centre-back for Middlesbrough
 Alan Buckley, who was a striker for Walsall
 Paul K. Joyce (head boy in 1975), composer who wrote Can We Fix It? (reached number 1 in 2000) for Bob the Builder
 Tony Woodcock (footballer), who was a striker for Nottingham Forest

References

External links
 

Secondary schools in Nottinghamshire
Academies in Nottinghamshire
Eastwood, Nottinghamshire